Mikael Magnusson (born 15 March 1973) is a retired Swedish ice hockey player. Magnusson was part of the Djurgården Swedish champions' team of 2000 and 2001. Magnusson made 458 Elitserien appearances for Djurgården.

References

1973 births
Living people
Swedish ice hockey players
Djurgårdens IF Hockey players